CodeRush Classic is a refactoring and productivity plugin by DevExpress that extends native functionality of Microsoft Visual Studio (Visual Studio .NET 2012, 2013, 2015, 2017 and 2019).

CodeRush Classic provides solution-wide static code analysis (detecting errors in code at design time), and additional functionality to make it easier to correct code smells, complete code, navigate, search for symbols, highlight the structural elements of the code, format code, and generate and optimize code. CodeRush Classic includes 180 automated refactorings, and streamlines unit testing using NUnit, XUnit, MbUnit and MSTest, among other functionality.

In June 2015, DevExpress released CodeRush for Roslyn, a version of CodeRush that sits on top of Microsoft's Roslyn engine. In that same release, CodeRush was renamed to CodeRush Classic.

CodeRush Classic supports C# 5.0, VB10, ASP.NET, HTML, JavaScript, XML, and also XAML.

Functionality
The following is a partial list of CodeRush functionality groups:

 Refactorings
 Code Generation Tools
 Code Issues
 Support for multiple unit testing frameworks NUnit, XUnit, MbUnit and MSTest
 Support for extensible unit testing to support any testing framework
 Visualization Tools
 Debugging Tools
 Advanced Selection Tools
 Clipboard Tools
 Navigation Tools
 Code Templates
 CodeRush Extensibility - Large community of plugins.

Plugins
CodeRush provides an API for developers to create third-party plugins extending core CodeRush functionality, such as:

 Class Cleaner
 Visual Studio Spell Checker
 Documentor
 Method Preview
 Enterprise Library Configuration Tool Launcher
 Commenter
 Copy Project

Awards
 Best of TechEd08

See also
Visual Assist
ReSharper

Notes and references

External links
Google Code Community Plugins
IDETools Tips and Tricks
CodeRush AddIns

Integrated development environments
.NET programming tools
Microsoft Visual Studio extensions